César Charlone may refer to:

 César Charlone (politician) (1895–1973), Vice President of Uruguay
 César Charlone (cinematographer) (born 1958), Academy Award-nominated cinematographer from Uruguay